The 2010–11 Colorado Buffaloes men's basketball team represented the University of Colorado in the 2010–11 NCAA Division I men's basketball season. Head coach Tad Boyle was in his first season at Colorado. The Buffaloes competed in the Big 12 Conference and played their home games at the Coors Events Center. This was the Buffaloes' last season in the Big 12, as they moved to the Pac-12 Conference in 2011–12.

Preseason
The Buffaloes are in their final season in the Big 12, as they will be moving to the Pac-12 in 2011–12. They finished the previous season with a record of 15–16 and 6–10 in Big 12 Conference play. Of those 16 losses, seven were by six points or less. Additionally, all five starters return from that team.

In the Big 12 preseason coaches' poll, the Buffaloes were picked to finish ninth. Cory Higgins was named the Preseason All-Conference First Team, while Alec Burks was an honorable mention. Both were also named to the 50-man preseason Wooden Award watchlist. Additionally, Burks was on the 50-man preseason Naismith College Player of the Year watchlist. Gary Parrish picked them eighth in the Big 12, and said that he "won't be shocked if they ride the Higgins-Burks tandem into the top half of the league and make the NCAA tournament for the first time since 2003." Jason King of Rivals.com named the Buffaloes the sixth-best team in conference, adding, "Don't be surprised if long-suffering Colorado sneaks into the NCAA tournament."

Roster

2010–11 Schedule and results
 
|-
!colspan=9| Regular Season

|-
!colspan=9| 2011 Big 12 men's basketball tournament

|-
!colspan=9| 2011 NIT

Season

Preconference season
The Buffaloes defeated in-state rivals Colorado State 93–80 in overtime, behind Alec Burks' 25 points. Marcus Relphorde contributed 18 points and Cory Higgins added 15. Levi Knutson hit four free throws in the final 57 seconds to seal the victory.

Big 12 season
Snapping a losing streak of 13 consecutive conference openers, Colorado knocked off No. 8 Missouri 89–76 as Alec Burks exploded for a career-high 36 points. This was the Buffaloes' first win over a top ten team since defeating No. 3 Texas in 2003. Cory Higgins had 18 points and a career-tying 10 rebounds. The Buffaloes had a 12-point halftime lead and never let Missouri get closer than seven in the second half.

Post-season
The Buffs were selected as the No. 1 seed for the 2011 NIT Tournament.

Rankings

Awards and honors
Alec Burks
Preseason All-Big 12 Honorable Mention
Preseason John R. Wooden Award Watchlist
Preseason Naismith College Player of the Year Watchlist

Cory Higgins
Preseason All-Big 12 First Team
Preseason John R. Wooden Award Watchlist

References

Colorado
Colorado
Colorado Buffaloes men's basketball seasons
Colorado Buffaloes men's basketball
Colorado Buffaloes men's basketball